Jeffrey Bowyer-Chapman (born October 21, 1984) is a Canadian actor, model, and television personality. He is known for appearances in films and television, most notably as Jay in the Lifetime dark comedy-drama series Unreal (2015–2018) and as one of the main judges on the first season of Canada's Drag Race (2020).

Early life 
Bowyer-Chapman, whose last name is a hyphenate of his adoptive parents' last names, was born in 1984 in Edmonton, Alberta, and adopted when he was 12 days old. His biological younger brother is Cleyon Laing, defensive end for the Toronto Argonauts. His biological father is Jamaican.

Bowyer-Chapman was raised, with one sister, in Rimbey, Alberta, a small "predominantly Caucasian" town of less than 2000 people, which he says people in the area refer to as "the Texas of the north." According to Bowyer-Chapman, the region was "very much, like, oil and gas and farming and ranching" and growing up there as a biracial gay man was akin to "a sick social experiment." He was, in his own words, "exposed to a lot at a very young age and expected to be very adult in very bizarre situations."

Bowyer-Chapman lived in Rimbey until his teenage years, at which point he moved to Vancouver, then began traveling as a model at age 15 throughout Europe, South Africa, and all across North America. He later moved to Vancouver again at age 21, which was when he began to take his acting career more seriously. He acted in his first movie, then moved to New York, living there for seven years before moving to Los Angeles in September 2016.

Career 
Bowyer-Chapman began his modeling career at age 15 after friends and school teachers nudged him toward that career path. His first test shoot was in Calgary. He began making decent money at the job around age 18 or 19, shooting advertorials, catalogs, and campaigns for brands such as Levi's and American Apparel. He is represented by Wilhelmina Models.

Alongside modeling, Bowyer-Chapman also began an acting career, making his screen debut in the gay-themed film Shock to the System (2006). He was named one of "Five of the Best..." in Out magazine's 2007 feature article "Canada's Coolest" and was listed in Mwinda magazine's 2009 special issue "The 10 Most Beautiful Africans In Entertainment". He has modeled in many countries including the United States, Canada, South Africa, and Europe. He has also modeled in international campaigns for American Apparel and Levi's.

He went on to appear in the television series Noah's Arc and The L Word, and well as the film The Break-Up Artist (2009). From 2009 to 2011, Bowyer-Chapman had a recurring role in the Syfy series Stargate Universe.

In 2012, he starred alongside Jussie Smollett in Patrik-Ian Polk's LGBT-themed romantic comedy-drama film The Skinny. In 2015, he began starring alongside Constance Zimmer and Shiri Appleby in the critically acclaimed Lifetime dark comedy-drama series Unreal, playing the role of Jay, a gay reality television producer. In 2016, Bowyer-Chapman appeared in the comedy film Dirty Grandpa. In 2018, Bowyer-Chapman joined the cast of the FX anthology series American Horror Story for its eighth season, subtitled Apocalypse.

In September 2019, he was announced as one of the three permanent judges on the first season of Canada's Drag Race, the Canadian version of RuPaul's Drag Race. As the show aired, Bowyer-Chapman was negatively received by many Drag Race fans and was subjected to what was deemed as "racist" comments from some fans online. At the suggestion of RuPaul, he deleted his Twitter account. He also felt uncomfortable during the production, commenting about a producer who encouraged him to be "the sassy one". In March 2021, it was announced that he would not be returning for the second season.

In May 2021, Bowyer-Chapman and his Canada's Drag Race co-judges Brooke Lynn Hytes and Stacey McKenzie won the Canadian Screen Award for Best Host or Presenter in a Factual or Reality/Competition Series at the 9th Canadian Screen Awards.

Personal life 
Bowyer-Chapman came out publicly as gay in a 2016 interview.

Filmography

Film

Television

References 
Citations

Works cited

External links 
 

Living people
1984 births
21st-century Canadian male actors
Black Canadian male actors
Canadian male film actors
Canadian male models
Canadian male television actors
Canadian male voice actors
Canadian people of Jamaican descent
Gay models
Canadian gay actors
Male actors from Edmonton
Black Canadian LGBT people
Participants in Canadian reality television series
Canadian Screen Award winners
21st-century Canadian LGBT people